

Duchess of Courland

House of Kettler, 1561–1737

House of Biron, 1737–1740 

 Council of the Duke, 1740–58

House of Wettin, 1758–1763
None, although Charles of Saxony was morganatically married with the Polish countess Franciszka Korwin-Krasińska.

House of Biron, 1763–1795 

 
Courland
Latvia history-related lists